The 12th convocation of the National Assembly was elected in the 2020 parliamentary election, and it first met on 3 August 2020.

Total membership by parliamentary groups at the dissolution of the assembly

References